This article lists the official squads for the 2010 Women's Rugby World Cup in England.

Pool A

Wallaroos head coach John Manenti announced a 26-player squad on 14 July 2010, including the majority of Australia’s World Cup-winning Women’s Sevens team in his squad, five players who return for third WRWC (Ruan Sims, Cheryl Soon, Tui Ormsby, Debby Hodgkinson, Alex Hargreaves) and four rookies (Megan Shanahan, Caroline Vakalahi, Cheyenne Campbell and Shannon Parry).On 23 August Tui Ormsby was forced to withdraw from the tournament because of a fractured eye socket. Bayswater and Western Australia centre Stacey Kilmister was flown in as a replacement.

Black Ferns head coach Brian Evans announced the final squad on 29 June 2010, with Canterbury flanker Melissa Ruscoe named captain, newcomer Trish Hina (who has already represented New Zealand in rugby league) and Monalisa Codling participating in her fourth Women’s Rugby World Cup.A knee injury forced Canterbury utility back Amiria Rule out of Black Ferns. She was replaced by Auckland flyhalf Anna Richards, the most capped New Zealand women’s rugby player with 44 caps.

Head coach Denver Wannies confirmed nine players from South Africa’s previous IRB Women’s Rugby World Cup campaign and ten who took part in 2009 IRB Women’s Sevens World Cup in Dubai, while Mandisa Williams was named captain.Loose forward Nomathamsanqa Faleni was ruled out of the tournament with a serious shoulder injury during a training match in late July and replaced by Golden Lions flanker Pulane Motloung.

Wales head coach had initially named 23 players, leaving three spots open, but Alex Stokes has been withdrawn. Woodbridge second row and former wing Louise Rickard earned her call-up for her fourth World Cup, while Mel Berry was confirmed captain.Flanker Catrina Nicholas ruptured the anterior cruciate ligament in her right knee during the second half of the match against South Africa on 24 August. She was replaced by UWIC and Scarlets Number 8 Vici Owens.

Pool B

England head coach Gary Street announced the squad for Women's Rugby World Cup on 4 May 2010. Bristol No. 8 Catherine Spencer was named captain, while Saracens hooker Amy Garnett is the most experienced player with 86 caps and three rugby world cups behind her. Margaret Alphonsi, Charlotte Barras, Rachael Burford, Tamara Taylor, Amy Turner and Danielle Waterman will also feature in their second successive world cup campaigns. Lichfield’s Emily Scarratt is team's youngest member with 16 tries in 18 games.Richmond centre Claire Allan was replaced by Wasps wing Michaela Staniford because of a knee injury.

Ireland head coach Phillip Doyle announced the final squad on 12 July 2010, with UL Bohemians and Munster prop Fiona Coghlan named captain, the return of experienced back Lynne Cantwell after a spell in New Zealand and the emerging Nora Stapleton.Cooke and Ulster forward Lauren Day was forced to withdraw from the Ireland Women's World Cup squad through injury. Her place in the squad was taken by Laura Guest.Scrum-half Tania Rosser picked up a shoulder injury during the pool game against the United States. Blackrock and Leinster centre Grace Davitt was called up to the squad as a replacement.

Kazakh head coach Valeriy Popov called up 26 players including Almati flanker Olga Rudoy, the oldest player in 2010 World Cup and team captain.

Women Eagles head coach Katy Flores announced a roster of 26 players on 30 June 2010.

Pool C

Head coach John Long of Canada’s National Senior Women’s Team announced his 2010 World Cup roster on 15 July 2010. London Saracens prop Leslie Cripps captained the squad as she did for the past four years, while Gillian Florence made history as one of only two women in the world who have appeared in five World Cups.On 7 August 2010, lock Marie-Eve Brindamour-Carignan was recovered from a herniated disc and replaced by forward Ashley MacDonald.

France head coach Christian Galonnier announced the final squad on 12 July 2010.

A squad of 26 has been announced by head coach Gary Parker on 22 June 2010, including Scotland’s most capped rugby player Donna Kennedy (110 caps) and Suzi Newton, after a long-term injury.

Sweden head coach Jonas Ahl announced the final squad on 11 July 2010.

Notes and references

Squads
2010